This is a list of public art in Dorset, in England. This list applies only to works of public art accessible in an outdoor public space. For example, this does not include artwork  visible inside a museum.

Bournemouth

Bovington

Christchurch

Lyme Regis

Poole

Weymouth and Osmington

Portland

Other 
Dorset was once considered for a hill figure of Marilyn Monroe, but the figure was never made.

References 

Dorset
Tourist attractions in Dorset
English art